It is an epiphyte with 1-leaved pseudobulbs on creeping rhizomes. Pseudobulbs 1.7-3.5 x 1.1-1.6 cm, quadrangular, pale yellowish green, arranged distantly on a thick and wiry rhizome. Leaves 5-18 x 1.6-3.2 cm, erect, oblong, thick and fleshy, deeply channelled in the middle region, narrowed at base into a short petiole, obtuse at apex. Inflorescence arises from the base of the pseudobulb, pale green, longer than leaves with 5.5-9.2 cm long scape bearing  4 cup-like sterile bracts and a short raceme (4-5 cm) of pale yellow flowers smelling like ripened jackfruit of mango.
This belongs to the Section Careyana Pfitzer and is related to B. rufilabrum Par. & Rchb.f., but different in having erect, non-geotropic leaves, truncate-angulate, acute dorsal sepal, broad-based, oblique, falcate-aristate petal and yellow lip with brown papilla throughout except the median furrow. 

Bulbophyllum rosemarianum is a species of orchid in the genus Bulbophyllum.

References
The Bulbophyllum-Checklist
The Internet Orchid Species Photo Encyclopedia

External links 
 
 

rosemarianum
Plants described in 2001